Pastrana is a Spanish surname. Notable people with the surname include:
Andrés Pastrana Arango (born 1954), ex-president of Colombia
Francisco Pastrana (born 1979), Argentine international rugby union referee
Julia Pastrana (1834–1860), Mexican woman born with hypertrichosis who exhibited herself in 19th-century Europe
Misael Pastrana Borrero (1923–1997), Conservative Party politician and President of Colombia
Mauricio Pastrana (born 1973), Colombian professional boxer
Mónica Pastrana (born 1989), Puerto Rican beauty pageant and television presenter
Ophelia Pastrana (born 1982), Colombian-Mexican transgender physicist, economist, speaker, YouTuber, technologist and comedian
Romeo Pastrana (born 1958), Filipino midget actor, comedian and politician
Travis Pastrana (born 1983), American motorsports competitor and stunt performer
Viviana Ortiz Pastrana (born 1986), Puerto Rican fashion model and beauty queen

Spanish-language surnames